Product architect may refer to:

 Software architect
 Product design